Thiago Michel Pereira Silva, a.k.a. Thiago Michel (born May 15, 1984) is a Brazilian professional kickboxer and mixed martial arts (MMA) fighter formally competed for Bellator Fighting Championships in their season six lightweight tournament.

Personal life
Thiago Michel stated in an interview that when he was a child, he had a life-threatening throat infection and his father who taught him kickboxing starting at the age of 12, couldn't donate blood to his own son because he drank too much. This lead him never to drink again, strengthening their bond as father and son. Michel soon became a world kickboxing champion where he compiled 26 wins and just 2 defeats.

Kickboxing career
Michel was selected to represent Brazil in the 73 kg/160 lb division at the first It's Showtime event held in the country. He went up against Steve Poort, an up-and-coming Dutch fighter, at It's Showtime 60 in São Paulo, Brazil and won by unanimous decision.

He competed in the eight man 70 kg/154 lb tournament at Tatneft Cup Brazil in São Paulo on December 8, 2012, losing to Carlos Roberto by unanimous decision in the quarter-finals.

He faced Miodrag Olar at SUPERKOMBAT New Heroes 2 on March 23, 2013, in a 76 kg/165 lb bout and won on points after dominating in a display of brute strength and size.

He defeated Paul Marfort by unanimous decision on the Glory 12: New York - Lightweight World Championship Tournament undercard in New York City, New York, US on November 23, 2013.

Mixed martial arts career

Early career
Thiago Michel, who trains with world champion kickboxer Ely Perez, was the 2010 WAKO World Cup kickboxing champion at 165 lbs (75 kg) while also having a 7–1 record in MMA competition. He's also held Muay Thai titles and has posted knockouts in all nine of his career MMA wins.

Michel made his professional MMA debut on November 18, 2006, and has made a name for himself fighting mainly in his home country of Brazil. Michel won 6 of his first 7 fights before a 28-month break from the sport from 2008 to 2010. Before signing with Bellator, he amassed an impressive record of 9 wins and 2 losses. He was also ranked the number 1 lightweight prospect on Bloody Elbow's 2010 scouting report.

Bellator Fighting Championships
Thiago Michel is currently signed to Bellator Fighting Championships, competing in their lightweight division. Michel made his American debut at Bellator 62 on March 23, 2012, where he defeated fellow Brazilian Rene Nazare by split decision.

Michel faced Russian prospect Alexander Sarnavskiy in the opening round of the Bellator Lightweight Tournament on January 31, 2013, at Bellator 87. He lost via submission in the second round.

Kickboxing titles
2014 WGP Kickboxing Champion -78 kg (1 Title Def.)
WAKO Pro Pan American K-1 Rules Middleweight Championship -75.0 kg

Kickboxing record

|-
|-  bgcolor="#FFBBBB"
| 2016-05-08 || Loss ||align=left| Diego Gaúcho || WGP #30 || Brazil || TKO || 1 ||  || 33-5
|-
|-  bgcolor="#CCFFCC"
| 2015-10-31 || Win ||align=left| Fernando Nonato || WGP #27, Final || Rio de Janeiro, Brazil || Decision ||  || 3:00 || 33-4
|-
! style=background:white colspan=9 |
|-
|-  bgcolor="#FFBBBB"
| 2014-11-21 || Loss ||align=left| Datsi Datsiev || Battle of Champions 7 || Moscow, Russia || Decision (unanimous) || 5 || 3:00 || 32-4
|-
! style=background:white colspan=9 |
|-
|-  bgcolor="#CCFFCC"
| 2014-07-26 || Win ||align=left| Inaftali Gomes || WGP #21, Final || São Paulo, Brazil || Decision (unanimous) || 3 || 3:00 || 32-3
|-
! style=background:white colspan=9 |
|-
|-  bgcolor="#CCFFCC"
| 2014-07-26 || Win ||align=left| Diego Sebastião || WGP #21, Semi Finals || São Paulo, Brazil || Decision (unanimous) || 3 || 3:00 || 31-3
|-
|-  bgcolor="#CCFFCC"
| 2014-04-26 || Win ||align=left| Ricardo Fernandes || WGP SUPER 4  || São Paulo, Brazil || Decision (unanimous) || 3 || 3:00 || 30-3
|-
|-  bgcolor="#CCFFCC"
| 2013-11-23 || Win ||align=left| Paul Marfort || Glory 12: New York || New York City, New York, USA || Decision (unanimous) || 3 || 3:00 || 29-3
|-
|-  bgcolor="#CCFFCC"
| 2013-03-23 || Win ||align=left| Miodrag Olar || SUPERKOMBAT New Heroes 2 || São Caetano, Brazil || Decision (unanimous) || 3 || 3:00 || 28-3
|-
|-  bgcolor="#FFBBBB"
| 2012-12-08 || Loss ||align=left| Carlos Roberto || Tatneft Cup Brazil, Quarter Finals || São Paulo, Brazil || Decision (unanimous) || 3 || 3:00 || 27-3
|-
|-  bgcolor="#CCFFCC"
| 2012-11-10 || Win ||align=left| Steve Poort || It's Showtime 60 || São Paulo, Brazil || Decision (unanimous) || 3 || 3:00 || 27-2
|-

|-
|-  bgcolor="#FFBBBB"
| 2013-10-03 || Loss ||align=left| Stevan Živković || W.A.K.O World Championships 2013, Low-Kick Quarter Finals -81 kg || Guaruja, Brasil || Decision (Unanimous) || 3 || 2:00
|-
|-  bgcolor="#CCFFCC"
| 2013-10-01 || Win ||align=left| Goksel Kotan || W.A.K.O World Championships 2013, Low-Kick 1st Round -81 kg || Guaruja, Brasil ||  ||  || 
|-
|-
| colspan=9 | Legend:

Mixed martial arts record

|-
|Loss
|align=center| 11–4
|Alexander Sarnavskiy
|Submission (rear-naked choke)
|Bellator 87
|
|align=center|2
|align=center|3:43
|Mount Pleasant, Michigan, United States
|Bellator Season 8 Lightweight Tournament Quarterfinal
|-
|Win
|align=center| 11–3
|David Gardner
|TKO (Knee to the Body and Punches)
|Brasil Fight 6 - Brazil vs. USA
|
|align=center|2
|align=center|2:45
|Belo Horizonte, Minas Gerais, Brazil
|
|-
|Loss
|align=center| 10–3
|Brent Weedman
|Decision (split)
|Bellator 66
|
|align=center|3
|align=center|5:00
|Cleveland, Ohio, United States
|Bellator Season 6 Lightweight Tournament Semifinal
|-
|Win
|align=center| 10–2
|Rene Nazare
|Decision (split)
|Bellator 62
|
|align=center|3
|align=center|5:00
|Laredo, Texas, United States
|Bellator Season 6 Lightweight Tournament Quarterfinal
|-
|Win
|align=center| 9–2
|Rodrigo Cavalheiro
|TKO (punches)
|Brazil Fight 5 - Back to Fight
|
|align=center|1
|align=center|n/a
|Belo Horizonte, Minas Gerais, Brazil
|
|-
|Win
|align=center| 8–2
|Erick Barbosa
|TKO (Punches)
|Brazil Fight 4 - The VIP Night
|
|align=center|1
|align=center|4:55
|Nova Lima, Minas Gerais, Brazil
|
|-
|Loss
|align=center| 7–2
|Alessandro Ferreira
|Submission (rear-naked choke)
|Brazil Fight 3 - Minas Gerais vs. São Paulo
|
|align=center|1
|align=center|1:10
|Belo Horizonte, Minas Gerais, Brazil
|
|-
|Win
|align=center| 7–1
|Felipe Olivieri
|TKO (doctor stoppage)
|Brazil Fight 2 - Minas Gerais vs. Rio de Janeiro
|
|align=center|3
|align=center|2:23
|Belo Horizonte, Minas Gerais, Brazil
|
|-
|Win
|align=center| 6–1
|Flavio Toto
|TKO (punches)
|BHI - Belo Horizonte Interacademy
|
|align=center|1
|align=center|3:42
|Contagem, Minas Gerais, Brazil
|
|-
|Win
|align=center| 5–1
|Murilo Filho
|TKO (punches)
|XFG - X Fight Games 3
|
|align=center|1
|align=center|2:45
|Juiz de Fora, Minas Gerais, Brazil
|
|-
|Loss
|align=center|4–1
|Ivan Iberico
|Submission (armbar)
|Juiz de Fora - Fight 5
|
|align=center|1
|align=center|n/a
|Brazil
|
|-
|Win
|align=center|4–0
|Damaso Pereira
|KO (soccer kick)
|FBC - Fight Brazil Combat
|
|align=center|1
|align=center|4:17
|Montes Claros, Minas Gerais, Brazil
|
|-
|Win
|align=center|3–0
|Luciano Pitbull
|TKO (head kick)
|FFMA - Festival Fighter Martial Arts
|
|align=center|2
|align=center|3:27
|Belo Horizonte, Minas Gerais, Brazil
|
|-
|Win
|align=center|2–0
|Rildo Benazar
|TKO (punches)
|MAUO - Martial Arts Union Open 4
|
|align=center|2
|align=center|4:07
|Belo Horizonte, Minas Gerais, Brazil
|
|-
|Win
|align=center|1–0
|Cesar Augusto Cunha Dias
|TKO (punches)
|X - Mix Martial Arts
|
|align=center|1
|align=center|3:36
|Divinopolis, Minas Gerais, Brazil
|

References

External links

Brazilian male mixed martial artists
Lightweight mixed martial artists
Mixed martial artists utilizing Muay Thai
Mixed martial artists utilizing Brazilian jiu-jitsu
Brazilian practitioners of Brazilian jiu-jitsu
Brazilian Muay Thai practitioners
Brazilian male kickboxers
Middleweight kickboxers
1984 births
Living people
Glory kickboxers
SUPERKOMBAT kickboxers
Sportspeople from Belo Horizonte